Majid Khodabandelou (born January 26, 1986) is a former professional association football player who played almost 200 matches in the top three tiers of the Iranian football league system. He played for seven different clubs in a career that spanned 14 years.

Club career
He began his career in the youth academy at Paykan, starting there in 1999.

Paykan (2006-2007) 
In 2006, he was promoted to the senior team for Paykan, but only made three appearances for the club before being transferred to Mes Kerman.

Mes Kerman (2007-2009) 
He transferred to Mes Kerman on the 1st of July, 2007, and scored his first professional goal in a match against Sepahan that December. He would go on to score four more goals with Mes Kerman, before being transferred back to Paykan.

Paykan (2009-2011) 
Exactly two years after being transferred to Mes Kerman, Khodabandelou transferred back to Paykan. In his second stint with the club, he would score seven goals in 61 appearances.

Mes Kerman (2011) 
In his return to Mes Kerman, he made just 5 appearances, before being transferred on the 1st of January of 2012.

Gahar (2012) 
Khodabandelou scored just a single goal in his time with Gahar, before transferring back to Paykan in July.

Paykan (2013-2015) 
He returned to a Paykan that had been relegated to the 2nd division of the Iranian football pyramid, the Azadegan League. At the end of his first season, the team was promoted to the Pro League.

End of career and retirement 
After his final spell with Paykan, Khodabandelou transferred to Shahrdari Ardabil, where he made 25 appearances and scored two goals in his first season. In his second season, he made no appearances, and transferred to Shahin Bushehr. He played his final professional game and scored his last professional goal in 2018. He did transfer to Damash Gilan but made no appearances with the side and retired after two seasons with them.

Club career statistics 

 Assist Goals

References

1986 births
Living people
Iranian footballers
Sanat Mes Kerman F.C. players
Paykan F.C. players
Association football midfielders